Pearl and the Puppets was a band from Kirkintilloch, East Dunbartonshire in Scotland. The band comprised singer-songwriter Katie Sutherland (vocals/guitar), Blair McMillan (drums), Gordon Turner (guitar), Scott Clark (bass) and Michael Abubakar (keyboard).

Sutherland's voice has been described as being similar to that of Regina Spektor and Dolores O'Riordan.

Musical career
Pearl and the Puppets were signed to the Universal Republic record label and headlined the Solus Tent at the Wickerman Festival, in Scotland.

Appearances
Pearl and the Puppets supported Elton John at Glasgow's SECC on 10 June 2009.
In the run-up to the appearance, on Friday 5 June 2009 Pearl appeared on STV's The Hour show promoting her upcoming gigs.

On 31 December 2009, Pearl and the Puppets played on BBC One Scotland's Hogmanay Live and went on to perform on the main stage at RockNess in Inverness-shire in June 2010 as well as a number of other summer festivals.

On 23 August 2010 they supported The Hoosiers at the HMV Picture House in Edinburgh.

They appeared at the SECC, Glasgow, on 19 November 2010 as part of the Children in Need appeal.

On 2 December 2011, Katie Sutherland announced that she will no longer release music under the Pearl & The Puppets name, but under her own name.

Featured songs
In 2008, the band's song "Because I Do" was featured on a Vodafone advertisement in Australia and New Zealand

Their song "Make Me Smile" was featured in a Victoria's Secret advertisement in the US and an Orange advertisement in Romania in March 2010.

References

External links
 Review
 Evening Times Feature
 Review

Scottish folk music groups
Scottish indie rock groups
British indie pop groups
Musicians from Kirkintilloch